Alvarado Hospital Medical Center is a 306-bed acute care hospital located in San Diego, CA, adjacent to San Diego State University. It serves the College Area and is one of only two hospitals serving East County, San Diego.

Overview

Alvarado Hospital opened in 1972 and currently offers more than 15 specialties, including a 24/7 emergency department that is designated a San Diego County STEMI (severe heart attack) receiving center.

In addition to its emergency department, Alvarado Hospital houses offers oncology, orthopedics, cardiovascular, otolaryngology, surgical weight loss and other specialties. The cancer program is certified by the American College of Surgeons Commission on Cancer. The hospital's surgical weight-loss program was nationally recognized in 1993 when surgeons there performed the first laparoscopic gastric bypass procedure in the United States.

The hospital operates a nationally recognized sexual medicine program - one of the first hospital-based sexual medicine program to open in the country.

Other services include a minimally invasive spine institute, which utilizes the O-Arm in back surgery; vascular services; traditional, minimally invasive and robotic orthopedic (spine, hip, knee) surgery; otolaryngology; radiology; mammography and endoscopy services.

History
Alvarado Hospital was founded in 1972. It was acquired by Prime Healthcare Services from Plymouth Health in November 2011. Prime Healthcare Services has more than 45 hospitals throughout the United States. Prime Healthcare is the largest for-profit operator of hospitals in the state of California based on number of facilities, and has been named “The Fastest Growing Hospital System” in the country by Modern Healthcare.

References

External links

 Prime Healthcare Services (Owner)

1972 establishments in California
Hospitals established in 1972
Hospitals in San Diego